Provița de Jos is a commune in Prahova County, Muntenia, Romania. It is composed of three villages: Drăgăneasa, Piatra, and Provița de Jos. 

The commune lies along the Provița River, to the west of the county, on the border with Dâmbovița County. It is traversed by the  DJ101E road, which connects it to the east with Câmpina and to the north with Provița de Sus and Adunați.

Natives
The commune is the birthplace of Dumitru Comănescu, who was briefly the world's oldest verified living man in the world before his death in June 2020 at the age of 111. It is also the birthplace of Aurora Cornu (1931–2021).

References

Communes in Prahova County
Localities in Muntenia